The final Battle of Luçon was fought on 14 August 1793 during the French Revolutionary Wars, between forces of the French Republic under Augustin Tuncq and Royalist forces under Maurice d'Elbée. The engagement on 14 August, fought near the town of Luçon in Vendée, France, was actually the conclusion of three engagements between the Vendean insurgents and the Republican French.  On 15 July, Claude Sandoz and a garrison of 800 had repulsed 5,000 insurgents led by d'Elbee; on 28 July, Augustin Tuncq drove off a second attempt; two weeks later, Tunq and his 5,000 men routed 30,000 insurgents under the personal command of Francois-Athanese Charette.

Notes

References 
Smith, D. The Greenhill Napoleonic Wars Data Book. Greenhill Books, 1998.

Battles involving France
Battles of the War in the Vendée
Battles in Pays de la Loire
History of Vendée
1793 in France